Winneshiek may refer to the following:

Places
United States
Winneshiek, Illinois, an unincorporated community
Winneshiek County, Iowa
Lake Winneshiek, reservoir

Other
Winneshiek Players, an American community theater group